The Maynard Lake fault is a normal fault that runs through Lincoln County in southern Nevada. The Maynard Lake fault is the longest of the faults of the Pahranagat shear zone.

References

Geography of Lincoln County, Nevada
Seismic faults of Nevada